Max Caster (born July 31, 1989) is an American professional wrestler and rapper, currently signed to All Elite Wrestling (AEW), where he teams with Anthony Bowens as The Acclaimed. They are former one-time AEW World Tag Team Champions.

He began his wrestling career in 2015 and signed with AEW in November 2020, beginning a team with Bowens called The Acclaimed. Caster is known for his hip hop-inspired persona, often rapping to diss his opponents during his entrance. He released his debut album, Critically Acclaimed, Vol.1, in May 2021, under the name Platinum Max.

Professional wrestling career

Early career (2015–2020)
Caster trained under Curt Hawkins and Pat Buck at their Create A Pro Wrestling Academy and made his debut for the school's promotion in February 2015, later becoming the inaugural CAP Champion in December of that year. He wrestled on the independent circuit for a number of promotions including Combat Zone Wrestling. He also made a WWE appearance as one of Bobby Lashley's (kayfabe) sisters on the May 22, 2018 episode of WWE RAW.

All Elite Wrestling (2020–present)
Caster made his first appearance for All Elite Wrestling (AEW) on the June 23, 2020 episode of Dark, teaming with Luther and Serpentico in a losing effort against Jurassic Express (Jungle Boy, Luchasaurus and Marko Stunt). He came back with his new tag team partner Anthony Bowens on the October 27 episode of Dark but lost to Best Friends (Chuck Taylor and Trent). In November 2020, AEW President Tony Khan announced that Caster, alongside Bowens, had been signed to a five-year contract with the promotion. The announcement also stated that Bowens and Caster would compete as a tag team named The Acclaimed.

Caster and Bowens made their first appearance on the December 16 episode of Dynamite, defeating SoCal Uncensored. The following week, Caster and Bowens unsuccessfully challenged The Young Bucks (Matt Jackson and Nick Jackson) for the AEW World Tag Team Championship.

On the March 3, 2021, episode of Dynamite, Caster defeated 10 to qualify for the Face of the Revolution ladder match at Revolution. However, at Revolution, the match was won by Scorpio Sky. At Double or Nothing on May 30, Caster competed in the Casino Battle Royale, but he was eliminated by Christian Cage.

On the August 3 episode of Dark, while making his entrance, Caster rapped about subjects such as Olympic gymnast Simone Biles' mental health issues, the Duke lacrosse case, the validity of PCR COVID-19 testing, and made a sexual joke about Julia Hart. AEW owner Tony Khan called the rap "terrible", said it should have been edited out of the show and announced that he would personally be taking over the editing of the show going forward. Caster was later removed from several independent events and AEW programming following the incident.  He returned to action at Dark: Elevation on September 1.

On September 21, 2022, at AEW Grand Slam 2022, The Acclaimed, with Billy Gunn as their manager, would win their first AEW tag team championship from Swerve In Our Glory (Keith Lee & Swerve Strickland).    

On February 8th 2023, after 140 days as champions, they lost the championships to Colten and Austin Gunn on Dynamite.

Personal life
Caster's father is former NFL player Rich Caster.

Discography

Mixtapes
Critically Acclaimed, Vol.1 (2021)

Championships and accomplishments
All Elite Wrestling
 AEW World Tag Team Championship (1 time) – with Anthony Bowens
Create A Pro Wrestling
 CAP Championship (2 times)
 CAP Tag Team Championship (1 time) – with Bobby Orlando and Bryce Donovan
 CAP Championship Tournament (2015)
National Wrestling League
NWL Heavyweight Championship (1 time)
NWL Vista Championship (1 time)
Pro Wrestling Illustrated
Ranked No. 171 of the top 500 singles wrestlers in the PWI 500 in 2022

References

External links
 

Living people
African-American male professional wrestlers
All Elite Wrestling personnel
Professional wrestlers from New York (state)
Sportspeople from Nassau County, New York
1989 births
21st-century African-American sportspeople
20th-century African-American people
People from Rockville Centre, New York
21st-century professional wrestlers
Professional wrestlers from New York City
AEW World Tag Team Champions